Giuseppe Astarita (Naples, 1707 – Naples, 1775) was an Italian architect and engineer of the late-Baroque or Rococo period. He was a pupil of Domenico Antonio Vaccaro and collaborated with Ferdinando Sanfelice; his style is influenced by Guarino Guarini. He worked on the following buildings, sometimes in work of reconstruction.

Works
Church of San Lorenzo delle Benedettine in Foggia
Church of San Pietro Martire
Church of Sant'Anna a Capuana
Church of San Raffaele
Palazzo di Sangro di Casacalenda, Naples
Church of Sant'Eustachio (Chiesa dell'Annunziata) and Church of Cappucini, Sessa Aurunca
Church of Santa Maria delle Graziedi di Melito, Province of Naples
Restoration of Torre Annunziata, Naples 
Restorations of Church of Gesù Nuovo, Naples 
Facade of Basilica of San Paolo Maggiore
Palazzo in via Materdei (number 20).

Bibliography

1707 births
1775 deaths
18th-century Italian architects
Architects from Naples